Arenodosaria is an extinct genus of foraminiferans. The species are known from the Miocene of New Zealand.

Species 
 †Arenodosaria antipodum (Stache, 1864) (syn. †Clavulina antipodum Stache, 1864 and †Clavulina elegans Karrer, 1864)
 †Arenodosaria kaiataensis Dorreen, 1948
 †Arenodosaria turris Kennett, 1967

 Names brought to synonymy
 †Arenodosaria antipoda (Stache, 1864)  accepted as †Arenodosaria antipodum (Stache, 1864)
 †Arenodosaria robusta (Stache, 1864) accepted as †Arenodosaria antipodum (Stache, 1864)

References

External links 
 Arenodosaria at WoRMS
 Arenodosaria at fossilworks

Globothalamea
Prehistoric Foraminifera genera
Fossil taxa described in 1939
Biota of New Zealand
Fossils of New Zealand